WDDC (100.1 FM, "Thunder 100.1") is a radio station broadcasting a country music format. Prior to country music, WDDC featured an adult contemporary format for many years as "FM 100, WDDC". Licensed to Portage, Wisconsin, United States, the station serves the Madison area.  The station is currently owned by Magnum Broadcasting.

Magnum Broadcasting station purchase
On March 1, 2011, Magnum Broadcasting announced that they had taken responsibility for WDDC and WPDR, which were located in Portage, Wisconsin.  Prior to this date, the stations were controlled by Zoe Communications Inc., based in Shell Lake, WI.  The purchase price was reported as $750,000.

References

External links

DDC
Country radio stations in the United States
Radio stations established in 1966
1966 establishments in Wisconsin